The ASK 13 is a two-seater glider that was built by German sailplane manufacturer Alexander Schleicher Gmbh & Co. It was and still is widely used for basic training of glider pilots.

Design and development 
In 1965 Rudolf Kaiser continued development of the two-seat Ka 2 and Schleicher Ka 7 by introducing the ASK 13, using a mixture of materials including metal, wood and glassfibre. It has swept-forward single-spar wings, positioned lower than in the Ka 7, which allows for a large blown canopy providing a good all-round view for both pilots.

The 6 degree forward sweep of the wing allows the rear pilot to be seated near the centres of gravity and lift.  The glider therefore maintains the same trim whether flown single seated or dual seated. The D-type leading edge torsion box is of plywood and the whole wing is fabric-covered. There are metal Schempp-Hirth air brakes above and below the wing, and the wooden ailerons are fabric-covered. The fuselage is a welded steel tube structure with spruce stringers and fabric-covered overall, except for the nose, which is glassfibre. The tail unit is plywood-covered, except for the rear part of the rudder and elevators, which are fabric-covered, and there is a Flettner trim tab in the starboard elevator.

Landing gear consists of a non-retractable sprung wheel, mounted aft of the centre of gravity. The original design featured a skid under the nose and tail, although on many K13s these have been replaced with wheels to make handling on hard surfaces easier. 

It first flew in prototype form in July 1966 and by January 1978 a total of approximately 700 ASK 13s had been built by Schleicher.  They are superb training gliders because they stall and spin well but these manoeuvres are easy to recover from.  Their construction also gives them great strength and yet they are easily repairable.

The aircraft was succeeded by the ASK 21.

Specifications

See also

References

Schleicher Web Site
Sailplane Directory

1960s German sailplanes
Schleicher aircraft
Forward-swept-wing aircraft
Mid-wing aircraft
Aircraft first flown in 1966